Shabab al-Khalil SCl, or simply Shabab al-Khalil, is a Palestinian professional football club from the city of Hebron that plays in the West Bank Premier League. Champion of Palestine this season (6th title of club's history).

Crest

Honours
 West Bank League (6)
 Champions (6): 1979, 1982, 1986, 1999, 2016, 2021
 Runners-up (2): 2012, 2019
 West Bank Cup
 Winners (4): 1978, 1981, 1985, 2013
 Runners-up (4): 2000, 2008, 2010, 2017
 West Bank Super Cup
 Winners (1): 2013
 Runners-up (1): 2016
 Yasser Arafat Cup - Northern Provinces
 Winners (2): 2013–14, 2016–17
 Runners-up (1): 2015–16

Juniors 
 Tokyo League
 Winners (1): 2019

Performance in AFC competitions
AFC Cup: 1 Appearance
2017: Play-off round

Continental record

Current squad
As of 22 June 2022. These are the players registered by the AFC to play in the 2022 AFC Cup.

References

For 2007 kit colors:

External links
Club profile - fifa.com

Football clubs in the West Bank
Sport in Hebron
Association football clubs established in 1943
1943 establishments in Mandatory Palestine